Bégard is a commune in the Côtes-d'Armor department in Brittany in northwestern France.

Population

Inhabitants of Bégard are called Bégarrois.

Breton language
The municipality launched a linguistic plan through Ya d'ar brezhoneg on October the 25th of 2004.

In 2008, 5.89% of the primary school children attended the bilingual schools.

Twinning
Bégard is twinned with St Asaph in Wales.

See also
Communes of the Côtes-d'Armor department

References

External links

Communes of Côtes-d'Armor